Spelobia talparum is a species of fly belonging to the family of the Lesser Dung flies.

Distribution
Afghanistan, Andorra, Austria, Belgium, Bulgaria, Czech Republic, Denmark, Finland, France, Germany, Great Britain, Hungary, Ireland, Italy, Latvia, Lithuania, Norway, Portugal, Russia, Slovakia, Spain, Sweden, Switzerland, Ukraine.

References

Sphaeroceridae
Muscomorph flies of Europe
Diptera of Asia
Insects described in 1927